Nuts is a 2012 French comedy film directed by Yann Coridian. Also known under the title Nuts, it stars Éric Elmosnino, Sophie Quinton and Valeria Golino.

Plot
At the age of 41 François seems to be perfectly happy. He is married to his first and only love Anne and together they have two children. When a relatively minor incident triggers a tantrum, François finds himself soon in an asylum for the mentally insane. After his release he is shunned by Anne. Desperate to get Anne back he tries to redeem himself but his parents as well as his best friend are less supportive than he hoped.

Cast

 Éric Elmosnino as François
 Sophie Quinton as Anna
 Valeria Golino as Giovanna
 Luis Rego as François's father
 Evelyne Buyle as François's mother
 Anémone as Dr. Vorov
 Luce as Solveig
 Brigitte Sy as Madame Herschel
 Michaël Abiteboul as François's brother
 Suliane Brahim as Soraya
 Partha Pratim Majumder as Cadress
 Jean-Louis Coulloc'h as Abdel
 Gustave Kervern as Bertrand
 Marie Denarnaud as Anna's friend

Production
It is the first film directed by Yann Coridian. It is also the debut film of singer Luce.

References

External links
 

2012 films
2012 directorial debut films
French comedy films
2010s French-language films
2012 comedy films
2010s French films